Risaralda may refer to:

 Risaralda Department, an administrative division of Colombia

 Risaralda, Caldas a town and municipality in Caldas Department